A list of films produced in the Tamil film industry in India in 1943:

References

Films, Tamil
Lists of 1943 films by country or language
1943
1940s Tamil-language films